The barbel steed (Hemibarbus labeo) is a species of small freshwater fish in the family Cyprinidae. It is found throughout the Amur basin in eastern Asia to northern Vietnam, Japan and islands of Hainan and Taiwan.

References

 

Hemibarbus
Fish described in 1776